Vengeance of the Vikings is a 1965 film directed by Mario Caiano.

Cast
Gordon Mitchell	... 	Sven / Byarni
Giuliano Gemma	... 	Erik
Eleonora Bianchi	... 	Gudrid (as Ely McWhite)
Elisa Montés	... 	Wa-ta-wa
Eduardo Fajardo	... 	Olaf
Beni Deus	... 	Torstein (as Beny Deus)
Alfio Caltabiano	... 	Narvik - Viking Warrior / Wingar - Indian Chief
Lucio De Santis	... 	Eyolf
Erno Crisa	... 	Erloff
Roberto Ceccacci		(as Roby Ceccacci)
Aldo Pini
Fortunato Arena	... 	Thormann
Fedele Gentile	... 	Viking Chief
Franco Morici
Aldo Bufi Landi	... 	Angheropoulos
Al Parker

Production
The scenes showing tropical greenery were filmed in a botanical garden north of Málaga.

Release
Vengeance of the Vikings was released on 24 September 1965.

References

Sources

External links
 

1965 films
1960s fantasy adventure films
Spanish fantasy adventure films
Films directed by Mario Caiano
Films set in the Viking Age
Italian fantasy adventure films
Cultural depictions of Erik the Red
Yugoslav fantasy adventure films
1960s Italian films